Mateusz Marzec (born 13 August 1994) is a Polish professional footballer who plays as a midfielder for GKS Katowice.

Career

At the age of 16, Marzec debuted for Polish seventh division side Małapanew Ozimek, helping them achieve promotion to fourth division with 3 years.

In 2018, he signed for Olimpia Grudziądz in the Polish third division.

For the second half of the 2019–20 season, he signed for Polish second division team Podbeskidzie Bielsko-Biała, helping them achieve promotion to the top flight within a season.

On 29 July 2021, he returned to Odra Opole, signing a two-year contract.

On 4 January 2023, Marzec joined another I liga side GKS Katowice on a two-and-a-half year deal.

References

External links
 Mateusz Marzec at 90minut

Polish footballers
Living people
1994 births
Association football midfielders
Odra Opole players
Olimpia Grudziądz players
GKS Bełchatów players
Podbeskidzie Bielsko-Biała players
GKS Katowice players
Ekstraklasa players
I liga players
II liga players
III liga players
People from Ozimek